Laurelton is a census-designated place located in Hartley Township, Union County in the state of Pennsylvania.  It is located in western Union County along Pennsylvania Route 235.  As of the 2010 census the population was 221 residents.

Demographics

References

Census-designated places in Union County, Pennsylvania
Census-designated places in Pennsylvania